Pumpkin Creek may refer to:

Pumpkin Creek (Nebraska), a stream in Nebraska
Pumpkin Creek Site, an archaeological site in Oklahoma